The Soul2Soul: The World Tour is the third co-headlining tour by American country music recording artists, and husband and wife, Tim McGraw and Faith Hill. It marked the first time the duo have toured together since 2007. It began on April 7, 2017, in New Orleans. Performances consist of a setlist of duets between the couple and solos. The first leg of the tour played seventy shows, and as of December 11, 2017, every show was sold out, and grossed over 79 million dollars. According to Pollstar's 2017 Mid-Year report, it was ranked the 24th best tour.

Background
In October 2016, a special concert was planned at the Ryman Auditorium in Nashville. Under the moniker "Sam & Audrey", the duo performed their hits, while announcing the forthcoming 2017 tour. The itinerary was released the following day. On January 31, 2017, McGraw and Hill announced the opening acts via Facebook Live. Each weekend will feature a different opening act, handpicked by the duo. They also revealed additional tour dates and plans to perform shows outside North America. When introducing the tour, Hill stated: 
"We have the best fans in the world, who have been with us through our entire journey and we are so excited to celebrate with them by going back on the road and showcasing an exciting new show. It's always great when we get to work together and it's been awhile since we got to do that."

On September 28, 2017, Bob Harris revealed on his BBC Radio 2 show that McGraw and Hill were the first announced headliners for the 2018 C2C: Country to Country festival which takes place in London, Glasgow and Dublin. In November 2017, a second American leg of the tour was announced.

The show and the stage
The show begins with a ten-second countdown clock, after that futuristic music begins to play. Hill and McGraw begin to say a speech which ends with, "face to face, heart to heart, and soul to soul." Then two black boxes rise up onto the b-stage, as the boxes descends both Hill and McGraw appear, and perform Aretha Franklin and George Michael's "I Knew You Were Waiting For Me". During "Break First" (a new pop centric song from the couple), the video screens displays fragments of glass shattering behind them. When McGraw performs "Angry All the Time", Hill plays the acoustic guitar while singing background vocals. The show lasts for two hours and fifteen minutes with a setlist of thirty songs. They go back and forth singing with each other and alone during solos. McGraw and Hill perform their past hits and songs off their upcoming album. They close with "I Need You".

The stage and production is made up of laser lights, risers, special effects, eighty-foot wide video board, HD and LED screens. During the show family photos are projected onto the eighty-foot wide video board. A ten piece band backs the couple.

Opening acts

Kelsea Ballerini
Brothers Osborne 
Cam 
Brandy Clark 
Brent Cobb 
Devin Dawson
Seth Ennis 
Rhiannon Giddens
Natalie Hemby 
High Valley
Chris Janson 
Joseph 
Chris Lane 
LoCash 
Lori McKenna 
Midland 
Old Dominion
Steve Moakler 
NEEDTOBREATHE 
Jon Pardi 
Eric Paslay
Rachel Platten
Margo Price 
Ben Rector 
Maggie Rose
The Shadowboxers 
Caitlyn Smith 
Charlie Worsham

Source:

Setlist
The following setlist was performed at the concert held on April 21, 2017, at the Legacy Arena in Birmingham, Alabama. It does not represent all concerts for the duration of the tour. 

McGraw and Hill
"I Knew You Were Waiting (For Me)" 
McGraw
"Felt Good on My Lips"
Hill
"The Lucky One"
McGraw
"I Like It, I Love It"
Hill
"The Way You Love Me"
McGraw and Hill
"Like We Never Loved at All"
"Break First"
"Telluride"
"Devil Calling Me Back"
Hill
"Free"
"This Kiss"
"Breathe"
"Wild One"
"Stronger"
"Piece of My Heart"
McGraw and Hill
"Angry All the Time"
McGraw
"One of Those Nights"
"Real Good Man"
"Shotgun Rider"
"Humble and Kind"
"Live Like You Were Dying"
McGraw and Hill
"Speak to a Girl"
"It's Your Love"
Hill
"Mississippi Girl"
McGraw
"Something Like That"
McGraw and Hill
"I Need You"

Tour dates

A. These shows will be part of the C2C: Country to Country festival.

Critical reception
Tulsa World's Andrea Eger says "the electricity they generated could have powered their megawatt stage production with no help from PSO" According to the Orange County Register'''s Kelli Sky Fadroski, she was impressed with Hill's return to the tour stage stating that "she brought her A game" during her solo moments. For the duo's performance she described it as, "a connection and tenderness between them that just can't be faked."

Reviewing the show in London, Pip Ellwood-Hughes of Entertainment Focus gave the set a 4.5/5 rating, stating that booking country music royalty McGraw and Hill was "a real coup for the Country to Country festival and stating that they were "warm and funny on stage" and their set was "inspiring". Mentioning that anticipation was high for the duo's first ever UK performance, Ellwood-Hughes noted that their "packed" set drew "huge cheers from the arena crowd", citing Break First as an early highlight. He stated that the best parts of the set where when McGraw and Hill sang together, referring to their chemistry as "magical" and "off the charts as they trade glances, interact with one another and, at times, look at each other as if there is no one else in the room". Regarding the solo performances, he praised Hill's "energy and enthusiasm", citing This Kiss as a "one of the night's special moments" when Hill "became visibly choked up" as an international audience loudly sang along. Additionally, he called Hill's rendition of Breathe "stunning" and her Piece of My Heart cover a "powerhouse performance". Similarly, McGraw's "confident charisma" was praised and the moment where the audience burst into a spontaneous singalong of Humble and Kind which left McGraw visibly "overwhelmed" was picked as a highlight. Ellwood-Hughes called their performance of Speak to a Girl "beautiful and timely" and said that It's Your Love'' was a "perfect way to end the night and absolutely stunning". He was critical of sound issues that resulted in complaints from a large number of audience members who were unable to hear the artists because of loud bass reverb, causing many to leave midway through.

Notable events
During the show in Dubin on March 11, 2018, McGraw collapsed following his performance of "Humble and Kind" and was carried offstage by members of his crew. After twenty minutes, Hill returned to the stage and announced that McGraw was doing fine but was suffering from dehydration and she had made the decision not to allow him back onstage. Hill and the band performed “What a Friend We Have in Jesus” as a final a capella song for the crowd before ending the show early. Although disheartened, the crowd applauded and began chanting "get well Tim". A statement from the couple stated that McGraw "was attended to by local medical staff on-site and will be fine" before adding that "he and Faith thank everyone for their love and support and look forward to seeing their Irish fans again soon".

References

2017 concert tours
2018 concert tours
Co-headlining concert tours
Tim McGraw and Faith Hill concert tours